This is a list of mythologies native to Asia:

Buddhist mythology
Chinese mythology
Christian mythology (in Western Asia)
Georgian mythology
Greek mythology (see Greco-Buddhism)
Hindu mythology
Ayyavazhi mythology
Tamil mythology
Vedic mythology
Hittite mythology and religion
Indo-Iranian mythology
Ossetian mythology
Persian mythology
Scythian mythology
 Assianism	
Zoroastrianism
Indonesian mythology
Balinese mythology
Islamic mythology
Japanese mythology
Oomoto
Shinto
Kanglei mythology
Korean mythology
Meitei mythology (Manipuri mythology) 
Mesopotamian mythology
Ancient Mesopotamian religion
Babylonian mythology
Mongol mythology
Tengriism (indigenous Mongol & Turkic belief)
Philippine mythology
Anito
Gabâ
Kulam
Semitic mythology and 
Arabian mythology
Jewish mythology
Shamanism in Siberia
Tungusic creation myth
Turkic mythology
Tatar mythology
Vietnamese mythology

 
Asian